This article is part of the history of rail transport by country series

The history of rail transport in the Czech Republic began in the 1820s. Railways were built primarily for the transport of freight.  Periods when they were built and operated by commercial operators have alternated with periods of nationalization, public investment or government support. In 2009 the country had 9,420 km of standard gauge track, 3,153 km of which is electrified.

See also

České dráhy
History of the Czech lands
Rail transport in the Czech Republic
Transport in the Czech Republic

References

External links
 Enzyklopädie zur Eisenbahngeschichte des Alpen-Donau-Adria-Raumes 
 illustrated description of the railways of Czechoslovakia in the 1930s.

Czech Republic
Rail
Rail transport in the Czech Republic